Chandi is a Hindu goddess.

Chandi, or Chandee, may also refer to:

Places 
 Chandi, Thailand, a town in Thailand
 Chandi, Bihar, a town in India
 Chandi, Brahmanbaria, a village in Bangladesh
 Kot Chandi, a village in Pakistan

Other uses 
 Chandi (name), includes a list of people with the name
 Candi of Indonesia, a type of Hindu/Buddhist temple of Indonesia
 Chandee, a 2013 Indian film

See also